Donnington is a small village and civil parish in the Chichester district of West Sussex, England. The village lies on the B2201 road, two miles (3 km) south of Chichester. The northern part of the parish comprises the Stockbridge area of the City of Chichester.

The village lies on the Chichester Canal. The parish is also home to the Sussex Falconry Centre.

Governance
An electoral ward of the same name exists. This ward includes Appledram, and at the 2011 census had a population of 2,228.

History
Donnington is listed in the Domesday Book of 1086 in the Hundred of Stockbridge as having 21 households.

References

External links

 Sussex Falconry Centre

Villages in West Sussex